Harriet Baber (born January 6, 1950) is a professor of philosophy at the University of San Diego. She holds a Ph.D from Johns Hopkins University, 1980. Her research interests are in analytic metaphysics, philosophical theology, feminism and philosophy of economics. In addition, Baber writes for The Guardian (UK) and is a regular columnist for Church Times (UK). She is an Episcopalian.

Publications 
Baber, Harriet Erica, and Denise E. Dimon. Globalization and International Development: The Ethical Issues. Buffalo, New York: Broadview Press, 2013. 
Baber, Harriet Erica. The Multicultural Mystique: The Liberal Case against Diversity. Amherst, N.Y.: Prometheus Books, 2008. 
Baber, Harriet. Women's Dilemma: Is It Reasonable to Be Rational? Kalamazoo, Mich: Western Michigan University. Center for the Study of Ethics in Society, 1990.

References

21st-century American philosophers
Philosophers from California
Analytic philosophers
American Episcopalians
Johns Hopkins University alumni
Living people
Metaphysicians
The Guardian journalists
University of San Diego faculty
American women philosophers
20th-century American philosophers
1950 births
20th-century American women
21st-century American women